Fear Will Cast No Shadow is the third studio album by Florida metal band The Autumn Offering. The album was released on October 30, 2007 and sold an estimate of 1,300 copies in its opening week. It is The Autumn Offering's first album with former Hell Within's vocalist Matt McChesney. The song "Dystopiate" includes a guest appearance from Ralph Santolla of Deicide and Obituary.

Track listing
 "From Atrophy to Obsession" - 3:01			
 "The Castaway" - 4:09		
 "Crown Yourself a King, Kill Yourself a Queen" - 3:57		
 "Silence and Goodbye" - 3:15		
 "All That Falls Around Us" - 2:42			
 "A Great Distance" - 3:50			
 "Your Time Is Mine" - 3:15	
 "Fear Will Cast No Shadow" - 3:30		
 "March of the Clones" - 3:11			
 "The Wolves at Your Door" - 3:04			
 "Dystopiate" - 3:47

Personnel
The Autumn Offering
Matt McChesney - vocals
Tommy Church  - guitar
Matt Johnson - guitar
Allen Royal - drums
Sean Robbins - bass guitar

Additional musicians
Ralph Santolla - guitar solo in "Dystopiate"
Jason Suecof - guitar solo in "Dystopiate"
Jonathan Lee - drums in all songs
Joe Santangelo - lead guitar

References

2007 albums
The Autumn Offering albums
Victory Records albums
Albums produced by Jason Suecof